The Kawasaki Ki-60 was an experimental Japanese pre-World War II fighter aircraft that used a license-built (Kawasaki) DB 601 liquid-cooled engine. This was at that time an unusual choice because the majority of Japanese aircraft at that time used air-cooled radial engines.

Design and development
The emphasis in the requirements was for a high speed and a good rate of climb, along with a cannon armament. This was a complete change from the usual IJAAF penchant for lightly armed, highly manoeuvrable fighters with lightweight structures, epitomised by the Nakajima Ki-27 and the later Nakajima Ki-43. A requirement was issued at the same time for a lighter, less heavily armed, general-purpose fighter which was to be designed almost in parallel with the Ki-60; this became the Ki-61. Priority was to be given to the Ki-60, design of which started in February 1940.

The first prototype of the Ki-60 emerged in March 1941 as a compact, all metal, stressed skin monoplane with a relatively deep fuselage and tapered wings with rounded tips built around a system of three spars; a Warren truss main spar and two auxiliary spars. The rear spar carried the split flaps and long, narrow chord ailerons, while the front spar incorporated the undercarriage pivot points. The pilot's seat was mounted high over the rear spar, giving the fuselage a distinctive "humped" profile; the hood featured a framed, rear sliding canopy and an elongated rear transparent section. The main coolant radiator was housed in a long ventral bath under the wing centre-section and central fuselage, while the oil cooler was mounted under the engine with a long air intake. The prototype was powered by an imported DB 601A as production of the Ha-40 had not yet started. A total fuel capacity of 410 L (90.2 Imp gallons) was carried.

The armament carried was two synchronized, fuselage mounted 12.7 mm caliber Ho-103 machine guns which were set in a "staggered" configuration (the port weapon slightly further forward than that to starboard) in a bay just above and behind the engine. One German made Mauser MG 151/20 20 mm cannon was housed in a weapons bay in each wing.

From the start of flight testing it became apparent that the design was seriously flawed in several key areas. The take-off run was unacceptably long, while in flight the aircraft displayed some lateral instability, excessively heavy controls and poor control response. The spinning characteristics were described as "dangerous" and the stalling speed was extremely high. Although a top speed of  had been projected the Ki-60 was only able to achieve .

As a result, the second and third prototypes, which were still being built, were hurriedly modified in an attempt to mitigate some of the more undesirable traits. Approximately  were removed, primarily by replacing the MG 151 cannon with Ho-103 machine guns. Detail changes were made to airframe sealing and to the contours of the air intakes and radiator bath. Flight tests were still disappointing, with both of the modified prototypes displaying most of the shortcomings of the first. A top speed of only  was reached, with a climb rate still well below specifications. By this time the Nakajima Ki-44, which had also been designed as a dedicated interceptor, was beginning to show some promise and the Koku Hombu selected this in fulfilment of its requirements. From early 1941 the full attention of Takeo Doi and Shin Owada was focused on the Ki-61; the Ki-60 became important in that the Ki-61 design was able to be improved using the lessons learned from the poor characteristics of the Ki-60. Plans for production were cancelled in late 1941 after three airplanes had been built.

Specifications (Ki-60 2nd prototype)

See also

References
Notes

Bibliography

 Berliner, Don. Surviving Fighter Aircraft of World War Two: Fighters. London: Pen & Sword Aviation, 2011. 
 
  (new edition 1987 by Putnam Aeronautical Books, .)
 
 
 
 
 Tanimura, Masami with Kozo Tanaka; Yuji Kishida; Makoto Oda; Yoshiharu Nakano and Saburo Kawasaki. Kawasaki Ki-61 (Tony). Blaine, WA: Paul Gaudette, Publisher, 1967.
 Unknown Author(s). Famous Aircraft of the World, no.76: Japanese Army Experimental Fighters (1). Tokyo, Japan: Bunrin-Do Co. Ltd., August 1976.

External links

 The Ki-60 at www.warbirdsresourcegroup.org

Low-wing aircraft
1940s Japanese experimental aircraft
Ki-060
Ki-060, Kawasaki
Single-engined tractor aircraft